The Munk Debates are a semi-annual series of debates on major policy issues held in Toronto, Ontario, Canada. They are run by the Aurea Foundation, a charitable foundation set up by Peter Munk, founder of Barrick Gold, and his wife Melanie Munk. The debate series was founded in 2008 by Munk and Rudyard Griffiths, who moderates most of the debates.

The Munk debates are held in Toronto, at steadily larger venues as they have proven popular. Tickets are sold to the general public, and sell out shortly after being made available. 

A poll is taken from the audience both before and after each debate. The winner of the debate is determined by how many people are persuaded to move from one opinion side to the other. The debates have been broadcast on CBC Radio's Ideas as well as CPAC. The more recent ones have also appeared on international broadcasters including BBC and C-SPAN.

Debates

* Meaning there was initially a mistake made with the counting of the votes that was corrected later

Debate histories
In 2018, the debates hosted Steve Bannon, resulting in calls by several Canadian politicians for that debate to be cancelled. A rally outside Roy Thomson Hall over the debate resulted in the arrest of 12 people. The debate was held anyway. The next day, the Munk Debates announced a correction: a "technical error" had led to releasing an inaccurate debate result, wrongly stating that Bannon's arguments had swayed the audience in favor of populism. Actually, there was no net change in audience opinion.

In 2019, the debates continued to be "financially underwritten by the Canadian charitable foundation, Aurea."

2019 proposed debate

Munk Debates proposed a leaders debate on foreign policy during the 2019 Canadian election.  Justin Trudeau, Andrew Scheer, Jagmeet Singh and Elizabeth May were invited. Singh, Scheer and May agreed to attend. Maxime Bernier was not invited.

References

External links
Official website

Debates
Events in Toronto
2008 establishments in Ontario
Recurring events established in 2008